Rozita Alipour (also Romanized as "Rozītā Alīpūr"; born 6 July 1989) is an Iranian karateka, who competes in the kumite 61 kg division. She won silver medals at the 2017 Islamic Solidarity Games and 2018 Asian Games.

In 2021, she competed at the World Olympic Qualification Tournament held in Paris, France hoping to qualify for the 2020 Summer Olympics in Tokyo, Japan. She won one of the bronze medals in her event at the 2021 Asian Karate Championships held in Almaty, Kazakhstan.

References

External links

 

Living people
Iranian female karateka
1989 births
Asian Games medalists in karate
Asian Games silver medalists for Iran
Karateka at the 2018 Asian Games
Medalists at the 2018 Asian Games
People from Qaem Shahr
Islamic Solidarity Games medalists in karate
Islamic Solidarity Games competitors for Iran
Sportspeople from Mazandaran province
21st-century Iranian women